The 2010–11 Barys Astana season was the Kontinental Hockey League franchise's 3rd season of play.

Standings

Division standings
Source: Kontinental Hockey League Official Website

Conference standings
Source: Kontinental Hockey League Official Website

Divisions: KHA – Kharlamov Division, CHE – Chernyshev Division

Schedule and results

Regular season

|-  style="text-align:center; background:#fcc;"
| 1 || September 11 || Severstal Cherepovets || 2-5 || Jeff Glass || Kazakhstan Sports Palace || 4,500 || 0-1-0-0 || 0 || 
|-  style="text-align:center; background:#cfc;"
| 2 || September 13 || SKA Saint Petersburg || 4-3 || Jeff Glass || Kazakhstan Sports Palace || 4,100 || 1-1-0-0 || 3 || 
|-  style="text-align:center; background:#cfc;"
| 3 || September 15 || Spartak Moscow || 5-0 || Jeff Glass || Kazakhstan Sports Palace || 4,600 || 2-1-0-0 || 6 || 
|-  style="text-align:center; background:#ffeeaa;"
| 4 || September 17 || Salavat Yulaev Ufa || 5-6 (SO) || Jeff Glass || Kazakhstan Sports Palace || 5,300 || 2-1-0-1 || 7 || 
|-  style="text-align:center; background:#cfc;"
| 5 || September 19 || Metallurg Novokuznetsk || 4-1 || Vitali Yeremeyev || Kazakhstan Sports Palace || 4,200 || 3-1-0-1 || 10 || 
|-  style="text-align:center; background:#fcc;"
| 6 || September 23 || Dynamo Moscow || 1-3 || Vitali Yeremeyev || Luzhniki Minor Arena || 3,500 || 3-2-0-1 || 10 || 
|-  style="text-align:center; background:#cfc;"
| 7 || September 25 || Vityaz Chekhov || 3-1 || Vitali Yeremeyev || Ice Hockey Center 2004 || 2,700 || 4-2-0-1 || 13 || 
|-  style="text-align:center; background:#fcc;"
| 8 || September 29 || Dinamo Riga || 1-5 || Vitali Yeremeyev || Kazakhstan Sports Palace || 5,000 || 4-3-0-1 || 13 || 
|-

|-  style="text-align:center; background:#cfc;"
| 9 || October 1 || Dinamo Minsk || 4-2 || Jeff Glass || Kazakhstan Sports Palace || 5,000 || 5-3-0-1 || 16 || 
|-  style="text-align:center; background:#fcc;"
| 10 || October 3 || CSKA Moscow || 2-6 || Jeff Glass || Kazakhstan Sports Palace || 4,700 || 5-4-0-1 || 16 || 
|-  style="text-align:center; background:#cfc;"
| 11 || October 6 || Amur Khabarovsk || 5-2 || Vitali Yeremeyev || Kazakhstan Sports Palace || 4,100 || 6-4-0-1 || 19 || 
|-  style="text-align:center; background:#cfc;"
| 12 || October 8 || Sibir Novosibirsk || 3-1 || Vitali Yeremeyev || Ice Sports Palace Sibir || 7,300 || 7-4-0-1 || 22 || 
|-  style="text-align:center; background:#fcc;"
| 13 || October 10 || Metallurg Magnitogorsk || 2-5 || Vitali Yeremeyev || Magnitogorsk Arena || 6,870 || 7-5-0-1 || 22 || 
|-  style="text-align:center; background:#ffeeaa;"
| 14 || October 12 || Salavat Yulaev Ufa || 4-5 (OT) || Jeff Glass || Ufa Arena || 7,950 || 7-5-0-2 || 23 || 
|-  style="text-align:center; background:#fcc;"
| 15 || October 14 || Traktor Chelyabinsk || 2-4 || Vitali Yeremeyev || Traktor Sport Palace || 6,000 || 7-6-0-2 || 23 || 
|-  style="text-align:center; background:#ffeeaa;"
| 16 || October 16 || Yugra Khanty-Mansiysk || 4-5 (SO) || Vitali Yeremeyev || Kazakhstan Sports Palace || 4,300 || 7-6-0-3 || 24 || 
|-  style="text-align:center; background:#cfc;"
| 17 || October 19 || Sibir Novosibirsk || 3-1 || Vitali Yeremeyev || Kazakhstan Sports Palace || 4,300 || 8-6-0-3 || 27 || 
|-  style="text-align:center; background:#ffeeaa;"
| 18 || October 21 || Metallurg Novokuznetsk || 1-2 (OT) || Vitali Yeremeyev || Kazakhstan Sports Palace || 4,300 || 8-6-0-4 || 28 || 
|-  style="text-align:center; background:#cfc;"
| 19 || October 23 || Amur Khabarovsk || 3-1 || Jeff Glass || Kazakhstan Sports Palace || 4,400 || 9-6-0-4 || 31 || 
|-  style="text-align:center; background:#cfc;"
| 20 || October 27 || Ak Bars Kazan || 5-2 || Jeff Glass || TatNeft Arena || 3,790 || 10-6-0-4 || 34 || 
|-  style="text-align:center; background:#fcc;"
| 21 || October 29 || Avtomobilist Yekaterinburg || 2-3 || Vitali Yeremeyev || Yekaterinburg Sports Palace || 4,700 || 10-7-0-4 || 34 || 
|-  style="text-align:center; background:#fcc;"
| 22 || October 31 || Neftekhimik Nizhnekamsk || 3-5 || Jeff Glass || Neftekhimik Ice Palace || 4,500 || 10-8-0-4 || 34 || 
|-

|-  style="text-align:center; background:#cfc;"
| 23 || November 2 || Avangard Omsk || 6-4 || Vitali Yeremeyev || Kazakhstan Sports Palace || 5,500 || 11-8-0-4 || 37 || 
|-  style="text-align:center; background:#d0e7ff;"
| 24 || November 5 || Yugra Khanty-Mansiysk || 3-2 (OT) || Vitali Yeremeyev || Arena Ugra || 5,100 || 11-8-1-4 || 39 || 
|-  style="text-align:center; background:#cfc;"
| 25 || November 7 || Salavat Yulaev Ufa || 6-2 || Vitali Yeremeyev || Ufa Arena || 7,950 || 12-8-1-4 || 42 || 
|-  style="text-align:center; background:#d0e7ff;"
| 26 || November 17 || Lokomotiv Yaroslavl || 3-2 (SO) || Vitali Yeremeyev || Kazakhstan Sports Palace || 5,300 || 12-8-2-4 || 44 || 
|-  style="text-align:center; background:#fcc;"
| 27 || November 19 || Atlant Moscow Oblast || 0-2 || Vitali Yeremeyev || Kazakhstan Sports Palace || 4,700 || 12-9-2-4 || 44 || 
|-  style="text-align:center; background:#ffeeaa;"
| 28 || November 21 || Torpedo Nizhny Novgorod || 2-3 (SO) || Jeff Glass || Kazakhstan Sports Palace || 4,400 || 12-9-2-5 || 45 || 
|-  style="text-align:center; background:#fcc;"
| 29 || November 25 || Avangard Omsk || 0-3 || Vitali Yeremeyev || Kazakhstan Sports Palace || 5,500 || 12-10-2-5 || 45 || 
|-  style="text-align:center; background:#fcc;"
| 30 || November 29 || Severstal Cherepovets || 1-3 || Vitali Yeremeyev || Ice Palace Cherepovets || 2,000 || 12-11-2-5 || 45 || 
|-

|-  style="text-align:center; background:#fcc;"
| 31 || December 1 || Spartak Moscow || 2-3 || Vitali Yeremeyev || Sokolniki Arena || 1,100 || 12-12-2-5 || 45 || 
|-  style="text-align:center; background:#fcc;"
| 32 || December 3 || SKA Saint Petersburg || 2-4 || Jeff Glass || Ice Palace Saint Petersburg || 5,500 || 12-13-2-5 || 45 || 
|-  style="text-align:center; background:#d0e7ff;"
| 33 || December 6 || Dynamo Moscow || 2-1 (OT) || Vitali Yeremeyev || Kazakhstan Sports Palace || 5,300 || 12-13-3-5 || 47 || 
|-  style="text-align:center; background:#cfc;"
| 34 || December 8 || Vityaz Chekhov || 2-0 || Vitali Yeremeyev || Kazakhstan Sports Palace || 5,300 || 13-13-3-5 || 50 || 
|-  style="text-align:center; background:#fcc;"
| 35 || December 12 || Avangard Omsk || 2-3 || Vitali Yeremeyev || Omsk Arena || 9,586 || 13-14-3-5 || 50 || 
|-  style="text-align:center; background:#fcc;"
| 36 || December 22 || Dinamo Minsk || 0-4 || Jeff Glass || Minsk-Arena || 9,170 || 13-15-3-5 || 50 || 
|-  style="text-align:center; background:#cfc;"
| 37 || December 24 || Dinamo Riga || 4-0 || Vitali Yeremeyev || Arena Riga || 4,750 || 14-15-3-5 || 53 || 
|-  style="text-align:center; background:#fcc;"
| 38 || December 26 || CSKA Moscow || 1-3 || Vitali Yeremeyev || CSKA Ice Palace || 1,686 || 14-16-3-5 || 53 || 
|-

|-  style="text-align:center; background:#fcc;"
| 39 || January 3 || Sibir Novosibirsk || 0-1 || Jeff Glass || Kazakhstan Sports Palace || 5,400 || 14-17-3-5 || 53 || 
|-  style="text-align:center; background:#d0e7ff;"
| 40 || January 5 || Salavat Yulaev Ufa || 4-3 (SO) || Vitali Yeremeyev || Kazakhstan Sports Palace || 5,500 || 14-17-4-5 || 55 || 
|-  style="text-align:center; background:#cfc;"
| 41 || January 7 || Traktor Chelyabinsk || 4-3 || Vitali Yeremeyev || Kazakhstan Sports Palace || 5,000 || 15-17-4-5 || 58 || 
|-  style="text-align:center; background:#fcc;"
| 42 || January 9 || Metallurg Magnitogorsk || 1-3 || Vitali Yeremeyev || Kazakhstan Sports Palace || 5,400 || 15-18-4-5 || 58 || 
|-  style="text-align:center; background:#cfc;"
| 43 || January 12 || Amur Khabarovsk || 4-2 || Vitali Yeremeyev || Platinum Arena || 7,100 || 16-18-4-5 || 61 || 
|-  style="text-align:center; background:#fcc;"
| 44 || January 13 || Amur Khabarovsk || 3-5 || Vitali Yeremeyev || Platinum Arena || 7,100 || 16-19-4-5 || 61 || 
|-  style="text-align:center; background:#cfc;"
| 45 || January 15 || Sibir Novosibirsk || 3-1 || Jeff Glass || Ice Sports Palace Sibir || 7,300 || 17-19-4-5 || 64 || 
|-  style="text-align:center; background:#cfc;"
| 46 || January 17 || Metallurg Novokuznetsk || 5-3 || Jeff Glass || Kuznetsk Metallurgists Arena || 2,830 || 18-19-4-5 || 67 || 
|-  style="text-align:center; background:#ffeeaa;"
| 47 || January 19 || Avtomobilist Yekaterinburg || 3-4 (SO) || Jeff Glass || Kazakhstan Sports Palace || 4,400 || 18-19-4-6 || 68 || 
|-  style="text-align:center; background:#fcc;"
| 48 || January 21 || Neftekhimik Nizhnekamsk || 1-2 || Vitali Yeremeyev || Kazakhstan Sports Palace || 4,100 || 18-20-4-6 || 68 || 
|-  style="text-align:center; background:#ffeeaa;"
| 49 || January 23 || Ak Bars Kazan || 2-3 (SO) || Vitali Yeremeyev || Kazakhstan Sports Palace || 5,500 || 18-20-4-7 || 69 || 
|-  style="text-align:center; background:#cfc;"
| 50 || January 25 || Metallurg Novokuznetsk || 10-2 || Vitali Yeremeyev || Kuznetsk Metallurgists Arena || 2,100 || 19-20-4-7 || 72 || 
|-  style="text-align:center; background:#ffeeaa;"
| 51 || January 27 || Avangard Omsk || 2-3 (SO) || Jeff Glass || Omsk Arena || 10,070 || 19-20-4-8 || 73 || 
|-

|-  style="text-align:center; background:#cfc;"
| 52 || February 16 || Torpedo Nizhny Novgorod || 5-3 || Vitali Yeremeyev || Trade Union Sport Palace || 5,400 || 20-20-4-8 || 76 || 
|-  style="text-align:center; background:#fcc;"
| 53 || February 18 || Lokomotiv Yaroslavl || 3-5 || Vitali Yeremeyev || Arena 2000 || 9,000 || 20-21-4-8 || 76 || 
|-  style="text-align:center; background:#ffeeaa;"
| 54 || February 20 || Atlant Moscow Oblast || 1-2 (OT) || Jeff Glass || Mytishchi Arena || 6,400 || 20-21-4-9 || 77 || 
|-

|-
|

Playoffs

|-  style="text-align:center; background:#fcc;"
| 1 || February 24 || Ak Bars Kazan || 0–1 || Vitali Yeremeyev || TatNeft Arena || 5,600 || 0-1 || 
|-  style="text-align:center; background:#fcc;"
| 2 || February 24 || Ak Bars Kazan || 0–3 || Jeff Glass || TatNeft Arena || 4,800 || 0-2 || 
|-  style="text-align:center; background:#fcc;"
| 3 || February 27 || Ak Bars Kazan || 1–6 || Vitali Yeremeyev || Kazakhstan Sports Palace || 5,500 || 0-3 || 
|-  style="text-align:center; background:#fcc;"
| 4 || February 28 || Ak Bars Kazan || 2–4 || Jeff Glass || Kazakhstan Sports Palace || 5,000 || 0-4 || 
|-

|-
|

Player statistics
Source: Kontinental Hockey League Official Website

Skaters

Goaltenders

Final roster
Updated April 16, 2011.

|}

Draft picks

Barys Astana's picks at the 2010 KHL Junior Draft in Moscow, Russia on June 4, 2010.

See also
2010–11 KHL season

References

Barys Astana seasons
Astana
Barys